Under Burning Skies is a 1912 American short silent drama film directed by D. W. Griffith and starring Blanche Sweet.

Cast
 Wilfred Lucas - Joe
 Blanche Sweet - Emily
 Christy Cabanne - Emily's Husband
 Alfred Paget - Emily's Husband's Friend
 Edwin August - On Street
 Frank Evans - In Bar
 Charles Gorman - In Bar
 Robert Harron - On Street / At Farewell Party
 Charles Hill Mailes - In Bar / At Farewell Party
 Marguerite Marsh - At Farewell Party
 Claire McDowell - A Friend
 W. Chrystie Miller - At Farewell Party
 W. C. Robinson - On Street
 Charles West - The Bartender (as Charles H. West)

See also
 D. W. Griffith filmography
 Blanche Sweet filmography

References

External links

1912 films
American silent short films
American black-and-white films
1912 drama films
1912 short films
Films directed by D. W. Griffith
Biograph Company films
Silent American drama films
Films with screenplays by Stanner E.V. Taylor
1910s American films